Cytheridae is a family of ostracods belonging to the order Podocopida.

Genera

Genera:
 Abditacythere Hartmann, 1964
 Asymmetricythere Bassiouni, 1971
 Austrocythere Hartmann, 1989

References

Ostracods